Bryce Wade Brown (born July 24, 1997) is an American professional basketball player for Wilki Morskie Szczecin of the Polish Basketball League (PLK). He played college basketball for the Auburn Tigers and was the leading scorer for the Tigers first ever Final Four team.

High school career
Brown began his high school career at Columbia High School, where he averaged 18 points and 5 assists per game as a junior. He was playing a video game when his father, Cedric Brown suffered a heart attack, requiring emergency stent surgery. At the time, Columbia was competing in the Georgia AAAA state playoffs, and Brown was limited by a back injury, resulting in a loss in the championship game. As a senior, he transferred to Tucker High School. Brown was a three-star recruit, the number 70 shooting guard in the 247sports rankings. He committed to Auburn.

College career

Brown posted 10.1 points per game as a freshman at Auburn. As a sophomore, Brown averaged 7.5 points per game. He increased his scoring to 15.9 points per game as a junior, shooting 40.1 percent from the field and 38.2 percent from 3-point range. Brown was the first team All-SEC selection by the Associated Press and second team selection by the coaches. After the season, Brown declared for the 2018 NBA draft but did not hire an agent to preserve his collegiate eligibility. On May 29, he announced his return to Auburn, citing "unfinished business." As a senior, Brown averaged 15.9 points per game and became Auburn's program leader in made 3-pointers. He scored 34 points in a game against Dayton. Brown was named to the Second Team All-SEC at the conclusion of the regular season. He helped lead Auburn to the Final Four and had 12 points in the 63–62 loss to Virginia.

Professional career

Maine Red Claws (2019–2020) 
After going undrafted in the 2019 NBA draft, Brown was invited to play with the Sacramento Kings during the 2019 NBA Summer League in Las Vegas.

Following his performance in the summer league, he was signed as an affiliate player to the Maine Red Claws, the G League team owned by the Boston Celtics.

On December 7, 2019, Brown hit a franchise record 11 out of 11 three pointers for the Red Claws in a 128–123 loss to the Delaware Blue Coats. When the G League season was suspended on March 12, 2020, Brown was averaging 16.1 points, 3.6 rebounds, 2.4 assists and a steal per game while his 42.4% shooting from beyond the arc ranked 13th in the G League.

Westchester Knicks (2021)
On December 17, 2020, Brown was signed by the New York Knicks, and was then waived after training camp. He was then assigned to the Knicks’ G League affiliate, the Westchester Knicks. Brown averaged 5.4 points, 2.0 rebounds and 1.2 assists per game.

Long Island Nets (2021–2022)
In August 2021, Brown joined the Cleveland Cavaliers for the NBA Summer League. and on September 23, his rights were acquired by the Long Island Nets. On October 10, he signed with the Brooklyn Nets, but was waived the next day. On October 25, 2021, Brown was included in the training camp roster of the Long Island Nets.

Beşiktaş (2022)
On July 25, 2022, he has signed with Beşiktaş Icrypex of the Basketbol Süper Ligi (BSL).

Wilki Morskie Szczecin (2022–present)
On October 29, 2022, he has signed with Wilki Morskie Szczecin of the Polish Basketball League (PLK).

The Basketball Tournament
Brown joined War Tampa, a team composed primarily of Auburn alumni in The Basketball Tournament 2020. He scored eight points in a 76–53 loss to House of 'Paign in the first round.

References

External links
 Auburn Tigers bio

1996 births
Living people
American men's basketball players
Auburn Tigers men's basketball players
Basketball players from Georgia (U.S. state)
Beşiktaş men's basketball players
Long Island Nets players
Maine Red Claws players
People from Stone Mountain, Georgia
Shooting guards
Sportspeople from DeKalb County, Georgia
Westchester Knicks players